Adair is a city in Adair and Guthrie counties of Iowa in the United States. The population was 791 at the 2020 census.

History

The Rock Island Railroad was built through the area in 1868, which led to the area being known as Summit Cut. This was in reference to the ridge that forms the watershed divide between the Missouri and Mississippi rivers. The town officially became known as Adair on August 20, 1872, when it was incorporated with the county.  The town is named after General John Adair, a general in the War of 1812 who later became the eighth governor of Kentucky. Adair was the scene of the first successful train robbery in the American West when on July 21, 1873, the James-Younger Gang (led by Jesse James) took US $3,000 from the Rock Island Express after derailing it southwest of the town. The derailment killed the engineer.

A rare F5 tornado occurred near this town on June 27, 1953, although the damage occurred closer to the town of Anita. One person was killed and two others were injured.

Adair is recognizable from Interstate 80 by its tall yellow "smiley-face" water tower.  Humorously known as "the happiest town on Earth", its roadsign warmly greets visitors with, "Welcome to Adair; it'll make you smile".  Some of the local businesses incorporate the smiley-face tower image into their company logos.

Adair is mentioned in the 2013 Stephen King novel Doctor Sleep.

Geography
Adair is located at  (41.500094, -94.643839).

Demographics

The Guthrie County portion of Adair is part of the Des Moines–West Des Moines Metropolitan Statistical Area.

2010 census
As of the census of 2010, there were 781 people, 361 households, and 208 families living in the city. The racial makeup of the city was 98.1% White, 0.1% Native American, 0.5% Asian, 0.8% from other races, and 0.5% from two or more races. Hispanic or Latino of any race were 1.3% of the population.

There were 361 households, of which 24.9% had children under the age of 18 living with them, 48.2% were married couples living together, 7.8% had a female householder with no husband present, 1.7% had a male householder with no wife present, and 42.4% were non-families. 38.8% of all households were made up of individuals, and 19.4% had someone living alone who was 65 years of age or older. The average household size was 2.16 and the average family size was 2.88.

The median age in the city was 41.9 years. 23.2% of residents were under the age of 18; 7.3% were between the ages of 18 and 24; 24.8% were from 25 to 44; 26.9% were from 45 to 64; and 17.8% were 65 years of age or older. The gender makeup of the city was 49.0% male and 51.0% female.

2000 census
As of the census of 2000, there were 839 people, 366 households, and 214 families living in the city. The racial makeup of the city was 99.05% White, 0.12% Native American, 0.36% Asian, 0.24% from other races, and 0.24% from two or more races. Hispanic or Latino of any race were 1.19% of the population.

There were 366 households, out of which 29.5% had children under the age of 18 living with them, 51.4% were married couples living together, 5.7% had a female householder with no husband present, and 41.5% were non-families. 39.1% of all households were made up of individuals, and 21.0% had someone living alone who was 65 years of age or older. The average household size was 2.97 and the average family size was 3.51.

Age spread:  22.2% under the age of 18, 17.3% from 18 to 24, 24.3% from 25 to 44, 22.5% from 45to 64, and 13.7% who were 65 years of age or older. The median age was 39 years. For every 100 females, there were 97.0 males. For every 100 females age 18 and over, there were 95.5 males.

The median income for a household in the city was $31,319, and the median income for a family was $42,847. Males had a median income of $27,083 versus $22,941 for females. The per capita income for the city was $15,557. About 2.5% of families and 6.5% of the population were below the poverty line, including 6.3% of those under age 18 and 8.6% of those age 65 or over.

Education
Adair is in the Adair–Casey Community School District, and houses Adair–Casey Elementary School and AC/GC Junior High School. Students attend AC/GC High School in Guthrie Center, a school of the Guthrie Center Community School District, under a grade-sharing arrangement.

In Popular Culture
Adair is mentioned as the hometown of Bradley Trevor, a character in the 2019 film Doctor Sleep.

Adair is shown in American Rust.

References

External links
 Adair, Iowa
  - hosted by the Adair–Casey Community School District (Older URL)

Cities in Adair County, Iowa
Cities in Guthrie County, Iowa
Cities in Iowa
Des Moines metropolitan area
Populated places established in 1872
1872 establishments in Iowa